The cabinet of Antti Rinne was the 75th government of Finland. It was formed following the parliamentary election of 2019 and was formally appointed by President Sauli Niinistö on 6 June 2019.  The cabinet consisted of a coalition formed by the Social Democratic Party, the Centre Party, the Green League, the Left Alliance, and the Swedish People's Party. The cabinet's Prime Minister was Antti Rinne.

This government was the first centre-left coalition to lead Finland since the Lipponen II Cabinet in 2003. The Rinne coalition had a total of 117 seats (58.5%) in the 200-seat parliament.

Rinne announced the resignation of his government on 3 December 2019. It continued its term as a caretaker government until a new government, the Marin Cabinet, was formed.

Ministers 

The Rinne cabinet comprised 19 ministers: seven ministers from the Social Democratic Party, five ministers from the Centre Party, three from the Green League, and two each from the Left Alliance and the Swedish People's Party.

The constitution requires ministers to be "honest and competent". The nomination of Centre's Antti Kaikkonen as the Minister of Defence drew considerable controversy due to his previous conviction from political corruption. Historically, the interpretation of the "honest and competent" clause has been permissive: the most salient example would be Aarre Simonen, who was also successfully appointed in 1966 despite his conviction in 1961, also from corruption. Rinne had the question checked with the Chancellor of Justice and Kaikkonen was cleared to proceed. The motivation was that there had already been two elections in between where Kaikkonen had been re-elected, and Kaikkonen had been law-abiding since.

|}

See also
 Finland postal strike controversy 2019

References

Cabinets of Finland
Cabinets established in 2019
2019 establishments in Finland
2019 disestablishments in Finland